Stevie White is a British comics artist who works under the pen name Stref. He has worked for The Beano and The Dandy, drawing Winker Watson, Dennis the Menace and The Bash Street Kids, and had a graphic novel for mature readers, Milk, published in 2009. He also draws the strip Raising Amy for PlayStation Comics and the iPhone.
He also drew Chester, the Alien-chaser and Dallas Ditchwater for The Dandy in the 2000s.

In 2015,  White created a graphic novel version of J.M. Barrie's Peter Pan.

References

British comics artists
Living people
The Beano people
The Dandy people
Year of birth missing (living people)